Tylden may refer to:

 Tylden, Eastern Cape, town in South Africa
 Tylden, Victoria, a town in central Victoria, Australia
 Tylden railway station, Victoria, a former station on the Daylesford railway line
 Tylden family, an ancient landholding family founded in England
 William Tylden (1790–1854), British Army officer of the Napoleonic era
 James Tylden (1889–1949), an English cricketer
Elizabeth Tylden (1917–2009), the British psychiatrist

See also 
 Tilden (disambiguation)